Rodney Clarke is an Australian former ice dancer. He was a four times Senior Australian Ice Dance champion at the Australian Figure Skating Championships.

With partner Monica MacDonald, Clarke won a junior national title and four consecutive senior national titles, beginning in 1984.  The duo competed at the 1988 Winter Olympic Games, finishing in last place out of twenty couples.

Competitive highlights
 with MacDonald

References

 

Australian male ice dancers
Olympic figure skaters of Australia
Figure skaters at the 1988 Winter Olympics
1966 births
Living people